Otolaryngology–Head and Neck Surgery is a monthly peer-reviewed medical journal that covers the field of otolaryngology, especially surgery of the head and neck. The journal's editor-in-chief is Cecelia Schmalbach (Temple University). It was established in 1995 and is published by SAGE Publishing on behalf of the American Academy of Otolaryngology–Head and Neck Surgery.

Abstracting and indexing
The journal is abstracted and indexed in Scopus and the Social Sciences Citation Index. According to the Journal Citation Reports, the journal has a 2021 impact factor of 5.591.

References

External links

SAGE Publishing academic journals
English-language journals
Monthly journals
Surgery journals
Publications established in 1995
Otorhinolaryngology journals
Academic journals associated with learned and professional societies